Frederick Peterson was a neurologist.

Fredrick Peterson may also refer to:

Frederick Peterson (politician), California politician
Frederick Valdemar Erastus Peterson, a.k.a. Val Peterson, Nebraska politician
 Fred L. Peterson (1896–1985), American politician and businessman in the state of Oregon

See also
 Frederick Petersen (disambiguation)